Daucosterol (eleutheroside A) is a natural phytosterol-like compound.  It is the glucoside of β-sitosterol.

References

Sterols
Glucosides
Saponins